Krishnaraja Wadiyar II (1728 – 25 April 1766), was the eighteenth maharaja of the Kingdom of Mysore from 1734 to 1766. He ruled as monarch during his entire rule, for the last five years, under Hyder Ali.

Life
On 8 October 1731, Krishnaraja Wadiyar II was adopted, like his predecessor, by Maharani Devajammani and Maharaja Krishnaraja Wodeyar I, under the title Chikka Krishnaraja Wodeyar.

He was crowned at Mysore, on 15 June 1735. He reigned under the control of dalvoy Devarajaiya Urs, who was in charge of Mysore rule from 1724 to 1746. After the decline of the Devarajaiya's power and eventual death, Hyder Ali, another dalvoy, came to be considered the de facto supreme ruler of Mysore from 1761 until his death in 1782.

He was a titular King. He could never enjoy power as there was a tripartite struggle between himself, Hyder Ali, and sarvadhikari Nanja Raja. In fact, the kingdom became weak because of the struggle. Hyder Ali gradually filled the place of Nanja Raja. The king executed many plots to regain his power but was not successful. His opponents were more resourceful, sly and united.

Krishna Raja Wadiyar II died in his capital, Seringapatam, on 25 April 1766.

Notes

1728 births
1766 deaths
Wadiyar II, Krishna Raja
Krishna Raja
Wadiyar II, Krishna Raya
18th-century Indian royalty